"Rockstar" is the second single from former N-Dubz lead rapper Dappy's debut studio album, Bad Intentions staying with the commercial pop template of his previous single, "No Regrets". It was released on 23 February 2012. The song also features Queen guitarist Brian May.

Music video 
A music video to accompany the release of "Rockstar" was first released onto YouTube on 18 January 2012 at a total length of three minutes and forty-eight seconds. It was directed by Colin Tilley. The video has received 14 million views on YouTube.

Critical reception 
Lewis Corner of Digital Spy gave the song a very positive review stating: Fortunately, Dappy hasn't wandered too far away from what made his first cut so successful. Head-bopping beats and lyrical word play detail the star's turbulent relationship with the press ("If the Guardian's my angel, why's The Sun burning holes in me?"). But what sets this apart from his previous effort is May's rumbling guitar riffs which culminate in an electrifying solo at the end. Given it's something few can resist, we're confident this will be another bona fide smash. .

Chart performance 
"Rockstar" made its first chart appearance in the week ending 8 March 2012, where it debuted at number fifteen on the Irish Singles Chart - lower than predecessor "No Regrets" (#8, September 2011). The track then debuted at number two on the UK Singles Chart with first week sales of 57,415 copies for the week ending 10 March 2012. "Rockstar" also debuted at number-one on the R&B chart, dethroning Flo Rida and Sia's "Wild Ones" and number three on the Scottish Singles Chart.

Track listing

Charts

Weekly charts

Year-end charts

Certifications

Release history

References 

2012 singles
Dappy songs
Songs written by Dappy
Takeover Entertainment singles
Music videos directed by Colin Tilley
2012 songs
All Around the World Productions singles
Song recordings produced by TMS (production team)
Songs written by Peter Kelleher (songwriter)
Songs written by Tom Barnes (songwriter)
Songs written by Ben Kohn
Songs written by Ayak Thiik
Rap rock songs